Rhyme & Reason is the second album by American new wave band Missing Persons, released in 1984. After the successful debut album by the band, this LP had a significant decline in sales. The pleasant-sounding "Surrender Your Heart" was its signature single. A video was created for it featuring animations from famous artist Peter Max and received heavy rotation on MTV, but the track was largely ignored by AOR radio. "Give" and "Right Now" were also released as singles, and videos made for both received airplay on MTV. Missing Persons embarked on a successful tour, but the album quickly fell off the sales charts.

Track listing
"The Closer That You Get" (Dale Bozzio, Terry Bozzio, Warren Cuccurullo) – 4:54
"Give" (D. Bozzio, T. Bozzio, Cuccurullo, Patrick O'Hearn) – 4:54
"Now Is the Time (For Love)" (T. Bozzio) – 3:40
"Surrender Your Heart" (D. Bozzio, T. Bozzio, Cuccurullo, O'Hearn) – 4:22
"Clandestine People" (T. Bozzio, Cuccurullo) – 3:00
"Right Now" (D. Bozzio, T. Bozzio) – 3:29
"All Fall Down" (D. Bozzio, T. Bozzio) – 3:23
"Racing Against Time" (T. Bozzio, Cuccurullo) – 3:24
"Waiting for a Million Years" (D. Bozzio, T. Bozzio, Cuccurullo) – 5:23
"If Only for the Moment" (D. Bozzio, O'Hearn) – 3:47

CD Bonus Tracks

* = previously unreleased

CD Bonus Tracks (2021 Rubellan Remasters edition)

Personnel
Dale Bozzio – vocals
Terry Bozzio – synthesizer, percussion, drums, vocals
Warren Cuccurullo – guitar, electric guitar, vocals
Patrick O'Hearn – synthesizer, bass, electric bass
Chuck Wild – synthesizer, keyboard

Production
Producers: Terry Bozzio, Bruce Swedien
Mastering: Kit Watkins
Art direction: Larry Vigon
Design: Larry Vigon
Photography: Bob Leafe, Helmut Newton
Liner notes: Ken Sharp

Charts
Album – Billboard (United States)

Singles – Billboard (United States)

References

1984 albums
Missing Persons (band) albums
Capitol Records albums